Bangladesh National Portal is a national portal of the People's Republic of Bangladesh under Access to Information programme ran from the Prime Minister's Office of Bangladesh. The information portal aims to provide information about all national unions, upazilas, districts and divisions of the country. It was launched on 7 March 2015 as a web portal containing 25,043 sites of government bodies in various tiers.

As of 2021, there are 1 million e-Directory and 46,000+ offices

2 million e-Service users/month and 5 million contents

10 lakhs+ officers and 60 million hits/months

1,000 innovation team and 100 thousand+ trained to update content

References

External links

Bangladeshi websites
Government of Bangladesh
2015 establishments in Bangladesh
Advertising-free websites
Internet properties established in 2015
Government databases